Rahul Dalal (born 2 February 1992) is an Indian cricketer who plays for Arunachal Pradesh. He was the leading run-scorer in the 2019–20 Ranji Trophy, with 1,340 runs in nine matches, and the only batsman to score more than 1,000 runs in the tournament. In a Ranji Trophy match against Bihar, he and Rakesh Kumar shared a 74-run partnership for the 7th wicket. It was the fifth-known instance of a fifty-plus partnership in first-class cricket with one batsman scoring all the runs.

References

External links
 

1992 births
Living people
Indian cricketers
Haryana cricketers
Arunachal Pradesh cricketers
People from Faridabad
Cricketers from Haryana